Mina Sue Choi is a South Korean model and beauty pageant titleholder who was crowned Miss Earth 2022. She is the first Korean to win the Miss Earth title, and the first to win one of the Big Four international beauty pageants.

Early life and education
Mina Sue Choi was born in Sydney, in 1999 and lived there until she was seven years old. Growing up, she lived in South Korea, Canada, the United States, and China. Choi attended the University of Illinois Urbana-Champaign, where she majored in Communication Studies.

Pageantry

Miss Korea 2021
On October 15, Choi won as Miss Gyeonggi Incheon 2021, a Miss Korea regional preliminary. She participated in Miss Korea 2021 on November 16 and finished 1st Runner-Up.

Miss Earth 2022
On November 29, Choi represented South Korea in Miss Earth 2022 and competed with more than 80 delegates from various countries/territories. 

During the course of the preliminary events, she won the following awards:

  Swimsuit competition (Asia & Oceania)
  Beach wear competition (Air Group)
  Long gown competition (Air Group)
  Resort wear competition (Air Group)
 Miss Mexico, Pampanga 2022

During the course of the final competition, she passed all rounds, including both the swimsuit and evening gown portions. At the Hashtag portion, she received "#Loyalty" as she moved towards Top 8. She said:

She eventually made it to Top 4. At Question and Answer portion, they were all asked: "What is one thing that you want to correct in this world and how would you correct it?," to which she answered:

At the end of the event, she was crowned Miss Earth 2022, succeeding Miss Earth 2021 Destiny Wagner of Belize. She became the first Korean to win the Miss Earth title and the first Korean to win any of the Big Four international beauty pageants.

Filmography

Television show

References

1999 births
Australian people of Korean descent
Living people
Miss Earth 2022 contestants
Miss Earth winners
Models from Sydney
People from Incheon
South Korean beauty pageant winners
University of Illinois Urbana-Champaign alumni